General Hal M. Hornburg (born December 7, 1945) was a four star U.S. Air Force general and commander, Air Combat Command, with headquarters at Langley Air Force Base, Virginia, and Air Component Commander for U.S. Joint Forces Command and U.S. Northern Command.

General Hornburg entered the Air Force in 1968 as a graduate of Texas A&M University's ROTC program. He has commanded at all levels—flight, squadron, wing, numbered air force and major command. He also commanded a composite fighter wing during Operation Desert Storm and the first Air Force composite wing during the services reorganization in 1991–1992. General Hornburg directed air operations over Bosnia, commanded the Joint Warfighting Center, served on the Joint Staff, and directed operations at Headquarters U.S. Air Force. He also has served as Tactical Air Command's F-15 demonstration pilot for the East Coast, as Air Force Liaison Officer to the U.S. Senate, and as Chief of the Air Force Colonels' Group. Prior to assuming command of Air Combat Command, Hornburg commanded Air Education and Training Command. The general is a command pilot with more than 4,400 flight hours. He retired from the Air Force on January 1, 2005.

Education
1968 Bachelor of Business Administration degree in finance, Texas A&M University
1974 Squadron Officer School, Maxwell AFB, Alabama
1978 Air Command and Staff College
1978 Master of Science degree in human resource management, University of Utah
1986 National War College, Fort Lesley J. McNair, Washington, D.C.
1987 Seminar XXI, Foreign Political and International Relations, Massachusetts Institute of Technology
1994 National and International Security Program, Harvard University, Cambridge, Massachusetts

Assignments
July 1968 – June 1969, student, undergraduate pilot training, Reese AFB, Texas
July 1969 – October 1969, student, O-1 forward air controller combat crew training, Hurlburt Field, Florida
October 1969 – September 1970, forward air controller, 21st Tactical Air Support Squadron, Cam Ranh Bay Air Base, Qui Nhon, Pleiku and Gia Nghia, South Vietnam
October 1970 – October 1972, T-38 instructor pilot, check pilot and flight examiner, 3500th Pilot Training Squadron, Reese AFB, Texas
October 1972 – January 1975, T-38 instructor pilot, check pilot and flight examiner, 64th Flying Training Wing, Reese AFB, Texas
January 1975 – September 1975, student, F-4 combat crew training, 31st Tactical Fighter Wing, Homestead AFB, Florida
September 1975 – January 1977, F-4D fighter pilot, 492nd Tactical Fighter Squadron, Royal Air Force Lakenheath, England
January 1977 – July 1977, F-4E fighter pilot, 512th Tactical Fighter Squadron, Ramstein Air Base, West Germany
July 1977 – September 1978, aide-de-camp to the Commander in Chief, Headquarters U.S. Air Forces in Europe, Ramstein AB, West Germany
October 1978 – November 1978, student, F-15 combat crew training, 555th Tactical Fighter Squadron, Luke AFB, Arizona
December 1978 – July 1982, F-15 fighter pilot and Chief, Standardization and Evaluation Division, 1st Tactical Fighter Wing, Langley AFB, Virginia
July 1982 – July 1984, assistant, Senior Officer Management Division, Headquarters TAC, Langley AFB, Virginia
July 1984 – March 1985, Commander, 27th Tactical Fighter Squadron, Langley AFB, Virginia
March 1985 – July 1985, Assistant Deputy Commander for Operations, 1st Tactical Fighter Wing, Langley AFB, Virginia
August 1985 – June 1986, student, National War College, Fort Lesley J. McNair, Washington, D.C.
July 1986 – January 1987, Chief, Western Hemisphere Division, Deputy Chief of Staff for Plans and Operations, Headquarters U.S. Air Force, Washington, D.C.
January 1987 – July 1987, Chief, Senate Liaison Division, Air Force Secretariat, Headquarters U.S. Air Force, Washington, D.C.
July 1987 – March 1989, Chief, Air Force Colonels' Group, Headquarters Air Force Military Personnel Center, Randolph AFB, Texas
March 1989 – April 1990, Vice Commander, 1st Tactical Fighter Wing, Langley AFB, Virginia
April 1990 – August 1992, Commander, 4th Wing, Seymour Johnson AFB, North Carolina (August 1990 – March 1991, Commander, 4th Fighter Wing (Provisional), operations Desert Shield and Desert Storm, Southwest Asia)
August 1992 – July 1993, Director of Operations, Deputy Chief of Staff for Plans and Operations, Headquarters U.S. Air Force, Washington, D.C.
July 1993 – November 1994, Vice Director, Operational Plans and Interoperability Directorate (J-7), the Joint Staff, Washington, D.C.
November 1994 – September 1996, Deputy Commander, Headquarters 16th Air Force, and Director, Combined Air Operations Center, 5th Allied Tactical Air Force, Vicenza, Italy
September 1996 – May 1998, Commander, Joint Warfighting Center, Fort Monroe, Virginia
May 1998 – January 2000, Commander, 9th Air Force and U.S. Central Command Air Forces, Shaw AFB, South Carolina
January 2000 – June 2000, Vice Commander, Air Combat Command, Langley AFB, Virginia
June 2000 – November 2001, Commander, Air Education and Training Command, Randolph AFB, Texas
November 2001 – 2004, Commander, Air Combat Command, Langley AFB, Virginia; Air Component Commander for U.S. Joint Forces Command; and effective October 1, 2002, Air Component Commander for U.S. Northern Command

Flight information
Rating: Command pilot
Flight hours: 4,400
Aircraft flown: T-37, T-38, O-1, O-2, OV-10, F-100, F-4D/E, F-15A/C/E, F-16C, KC-10 and T-6 Texan II and C-21

Later careers
Hornburg currently serves on the Segs4Vets Advisory Board.

Awards and decorations

Effective dates of promotion

References

1945 births
Living people
United States Air Force generals
Recipients of the Legion of Merit
Recipients of the Distinguished Flying Cross (United States)
United States Air Force personnel of the Vietnam War
Texas A&M University alumni
University of Utah alumni
Harvard University alumni
Recipients of the Air Medal
Recipients of the Order of the Sword (United States)
Recipients of the Defense Superior Service Medal
Recipients of the Defense Distinguished Service Medal
Recipients of the Air Force Distinguished Service Medal